Marsac is a commune in the Hautes-Pyrénées department in south-western France. It has a church, built in 1882, dedicated to St. Andre. The church bell is much older, dated 1683. Municipal scales built in the 19th century stand in a roundabout near the town hall.

See also
Communes of the Hautes-Pyrénées department

References

Communes of Hautes-Pyrénées